Paul Rudd is an American actor, comedian, writer, and producer. His career began in 1992 when he played a recurring role in the television series Sisters until 1995. In 1995, he made his film debut opposite Alicia Silverstone in the cult film Clueless, and starred as Tommy Doyle in Halloween: The Curse of Michael Myers. The following year, he played Dave Paris in Baz Luhrmann's romantic drama Romeo + Juliet. He co-starred in the ensemble comedy film Wet Hot American Summer (2001), and had further comedic roles in Role Models (2008) with Seann William Scott and I Love You, Man (2009) with Jason Segel.

Rudd has frequently collaborated with filmmaker Judd Apatow in such comedy films as Anchorman: The Legend of Ron Burgundy (2004), The 40-Year-Old Virgin (2005), Knocked Up (2007), Forgetting Sarah Marshall (2008), This Is 40 (2012), and Anchorman 2: The Legend Continues (2013). Since 2015, he has played Scott Lang / Ant-Man in the Marvel Cinematic Universe, appearing in Ant-Man (2015), Captain America: Civil War (2016), Ant-Man and the Wasp (2018), and Avengers: Endgame (2019) and Ant-Man and the Wasp: Quantumania (2023). He has also starred in the supernatural comedy film Ghostbusters: Afterlife (2021).

In addition to his film career, Rudd has appeared in numerous television shows, including the NBC sitcom Friends as Mike Hannigan (2002–2004), along with guest roles on Tim and Eric Awesome Show, Great Job! (2012), Reno 911! (2006–2007) and Parks and Recreation as businessman Bobby Newport (2012, 2015, 2020). He has also hosted Saturday Night Live five times. He reprised his role in the Netflix sequel miniseries Wet Hot American Summer: First Day of Camp (2015) and Wet Hot American Summer: Ten Years Later (2017). He played a dual role in the Netflix comedy-drama series Living with Yourself (2019), for which he received a nomination for a Golden Globe Award for Best Actor, and has since co-starred with Will Ferrell in the Apple TV+ black comedy miniseries The Shrink Next Door (2021).

Film

Television

Stage

See also
 List of awards and nominations received by Paul Rudd

References

External links
 
 

Male actor filmographies
American filmographies